Patrick Peters (born 7 November 1987 in Malchin, Mecklenburg-Vorpommern) is a German football defender currently playing for FC Tuggen.

Career

Early career 
Peters left his parents at age thirteen to attend boarding and sports schools. He began his career in 2001 with his hometown team, FC Tollense Neubrandenburg, transferring in 2004 to FC Carl Zeiss Jena and playing in the B-Junioren Bundesliga.

Professional career
After two successful years with FC Carl Zeiss Jena, Peters was scouted by the Swiss club FC Bazenheid in 2006. Peters next signed with FC Gossau July 2007 and was subsequently released only three months later to join FC Herisau. After half a year with FC Herisau, Peters signed a contract with FC Tuggen on 30 June 2009. On 15 April 2009, Peters signed a two-year contract with VfB Lübeck and joined his current club on 1 July 2009. On 18 December 2010, he returned to FC Tuggen.

References

1987 births
Living people
People from Malchin
German footballers
FC Carl Zeiss Jena players
Association football defenders
Footballers from Mecklenburg-Western Pomerania
1. FC Neubrandenburg 04 players